{{DISPLAYTITLE:C19H25NO}}
The molecular formula C19H25NO (molar mass: 283.41 g/mol) may refer to:

 4-EA-NBOMe
 Alentemol
 Dextrallorphan (DXA)
 Hexapradol
 Histrionicotoxin
 Levallorphan
 Tesmilifene, also known as N,N-diethyl-2-(4-phenylmethyl)ethanamine (DPPE)